Artem Viktorovich Kudashev (born 16 June 1990) is a Russian ice dancer. With former partner Marina Antipova, he is a three-time ISU Junior Grand Prix silver medalist and the 2009 Russian junior bronze medalist. In 2011, he teamed up with Yana Verner.

Programs 
(with Antipova)

Competitive highlights

With Verner

With Antipova

References

External links 

 

Russian male ice dancers
1990 births
Living people
Sportspeople from Tolyatti